Luddington-in-the-Brook or Luddington in the Brook is a village in North Northamptonshire, England. The name of its civil parish is Luddington. Owing to its small size, for census purposes the population of the parish is combined with the neighbouring parish of Hemington.

The village's name means 'farm/settlement connected with Lulla'.

St. Margaret's Church, a Gothic Revival building designed by Richard Carpenter, is Grade II listed.

References

Villages in Northamptonshire
North Northamptonshire
Civil parishes in Northamptonshire